Sawtooth (also known as Gargoyle) is a 2004 American thriller and drama film directed by Andreas Kidess.This film has been music composed by Marc Anthony Thompson.The film starring Andre Blandon, Millie Grant, John Hopson, Shawn Johnson, and Sara McCullah in the lead roles.

Cast
 Adam Beach
 Rodney Eastman
 Russell Friedenberg
 Gary Farmer
 Udo Kier
 Mark Boone Junior
 Abby Brammell

References

External links
 

2004 films
Films set in Idaho
American thriller drama films
2004 thriller drama films
2004 drama films
2000s English-language films
2000s American films